Jun Suzuki may refer to: 

, Japanese football manager and former midfielder
, Japanese football forward
, Japanese football midfielder
, Japanese football defender
Jun Suzuki (bassist), Japanese musician, currently plays bass as a support member to The Pillows

Fictional characters
, a character in the manga series K-On!